McKay Valley is the central of three largely ice-free valleys that trend east from Midnight Plateau in the Darwin Mountains of Antarctica. It was named after physicist Christopher P. McKay, of the NASA Ames Research Center, Moffett Field, California, who carried out investigations in the McMurdo Dry Valleys concerning micrometeorology, thickness of ice in frozen lakes, stability of ground ice, in 15 austral summers beginning in about 1980.

References

Valleys of Oates Land